Panzieri is a surname. Notable people with the surname include:

 Francesco Panzieri (born 1985), Italian visual effects compositor
 Raniero Panzieri (1921–1964), Italian politician and Marxist theoretician 
 Shabbethai Panzieri, 17th-century Italian rabbi

Italian-language surnames